Nurcu is a Sunni movement that was founded in the early 20th century and based on the writings of Said Nursi (1877–1960). His philosophy is based on Hanafi law and further incorporates elements of Sufism. He emphasized the importance of salvation in both this life and the afterlife through education and freedom, the synthesis of Islam and science, and democracy as the best form of governance within the rule of law.

Through faith by inquiry instead of faith by imitation, Muslims would reject philosophies such as positivism, materialism and atheism emerging from the Western world at the time. His notion of sharia is twofold. Sharia applies to the voluntary actions of human beings and denotes the set of laws of nature. Both of them ultimately derive from one source, God. His works on the Quran in the Risale-i Nur were translated into almost all of the  languages of Central Asia. Nurcu promotes the concept of the Quran as a "living document" which needs to be continually re-interpreted. From Nurcu other movements such as the Gülen movement derived.

The group was opposed by the government during the 1960s and 1970s as an Islamist movement. The group fragmented substantially in the 1970s and 1980s.  

In a 1999 academic publication, the Nurcu movement was said to have between 2 and 6 millions adherents.

References

Sunni Islamic branches
Quranic exegesis